Tom Glynn-Carney (born 7 February 1995) is an English actor and singer. He has appeared in Christopher Nolan's war film Dunkirk (2017), Tolkien, The King, and Rialto (2019), and as Aegon II Targaryen in House of the Dragon (2022).

Glynn-Carney is also the lead singer of the indie band, Sleep Walking Animals.

Life and career
Glynn-Carney studied at Canon Slade School in Bolton, and went on to study Musical Theatre in Pendleton College of Performing Arts, receiving a triple distinction star in performing arts, the highest possible grade for a vocational qualification. He then attended the Guildhall School of Music and Drama, where he studied acting. While studying, he participated in professional stage adaptations of Peter Pan and Macbeth.

His first experience on television was in 2013 when he had a role in two episodes of Casualty. He secured a lead role in the BBC military drama The Last Post, launched as part of the new season Autumn 2017 content on BBC1. He plays Lance Corporal Tony Armstrong.

From April 2017, Glynn-Carney starred as Shane Corcoran in the Jez Butterworth play The Ferryman, which opened at the Royal Court Theatre. He later transferred with the production to the west end at the Gielgud Theatre, leaving the production in October 2017. Glynn-Carney won the Emerging Talent Award at the Evening Standard Theatre Awards for his performance.

Glynn-Carney's first introduction to American audiences was in the war drama Dunkirk, directed by Christopher Nolan and released in July 2017. He plays Peter, the son of the small boat captain who sailed to rescue British soldiers from the surrounded city Dunkirk. In 2018, Glynn-Carney was named as Screen International's Stars of Tomorrow, along with Naomi Ackie, Jessie Buckley, and Connor Swindells amongst others.

In 2019, he starred as Henry "Hotspur" Percy in the David Michôd diected film The King in a cast which included Robert Pattinson, Sean Harris, Timothée Chalamet and Lily-Rose Depp.

In March 2022, Glynn-Carney joined the cast of House of the Dragon, where he played Prince Aegon Targaryen, first born son of King Viserys, played by Paddy Considine, and Alicent Hightower played by Olivia Cooke. He is also due to appear in the BBC miniseries SAS: Rogue Heroes, due out in October 2022. In December 2022, he was cast in The Book of Clarence.

Glynn-Carney is also the lead singer of the indie band, Sleep Walking Animals.

Filmography

Theatre

Awards and nominations

References

External links 
 Tom Glynn-Carney on the IMDb
 Sleep Walking Animals

1995 births
Living people
English male film actors
English male Shakespearean actors
English male stage actors
English male musicians
Theatre World Award winners
21st-century English male actors
People educated at Canon Slade School
Alumni of the Guildhall School of Music and Drama